Yanchao District is a district of Kaohsiung City, Taiwan.

History
After the handover of Taiwan from Japan to the Republic of China in 1945, Yanchao was organized as a rural township of Kaohsiung County. On 25 December 2010, Kaohsiung County was merged with Kaohsiung City and Yanchao was upgraded to a district of the city.

Administrative divisions
The district consists of Jianshan, Qionglin, Anzhao, Jiaoxiu, Fengxiong, Jinshan, Tungyan, Nanyan, Xiyan, Hengshan and Shenshui Village.

Education
 National Kaohsiung Normal University
 National Kaohsiung University of Science and Technology
 Shu-Te University
 I-Shou University College of Medicine

Tourist attractions
 Agongdian Reservoir
 Chang-E Valley
 Chiliu Waterfall
 Guanshui Temple
 Jiaosu Mazu Temple
 Mount Jiguan
 Mount Nihou
 Sun Valley
 Yangnyu Lake

Transportation
Yanchao is served by Freeways 1, 3, and 10, Provincial Highway 22, and City Route 186.

Notable natives
 Wu Rong-i, Vice Premier of the Republic of China (2005-2006)
 Yang Chiu-hsing, Magistrate of Kaohsiung County (2001-2010)

See also
 Kaohsiung

References

External links

 

Districts of Kaohsiung